Podostemum is a genus of plants in the family Podostemaceae. It is an aquatic plant with threadlike roots that attaches to rocks.

Species 
The genus Podostemum includes about 12 species:

 Podostemum acuminatum Wedd., 1873: Bangladesh.
 Podostemum ceratophyllum Michx., 1803: Eastern Canada to Eatstern United States, Honduras, Hispaniola.
 Podostemum comatum Hicken, 1917: Brazil (São Paulo) to Northeast Argentina.
 Podostemum distichum (Cham.) Wedd., 1873: Brazil to Northeast Argentina.
 Podostemum flagelliforme (Tul. & Wedd.) C.T.Philbrick & Novelo, 2004: Brazil (Tocantins).
 Podostemum irgangii C.T.Philbrick & Novelo, 2001: South Brazil.
 Podostemum muelleri Warm., 1911: Brazil (Southeast São Paulo) to Northeast Argentina.
 Podostemum ovatum C.T.Philbrick & Novelo, 2004: Southeast Brazil.
 Podostemum rutifolium Warm., 1899: South Brazil to Northeast Argentina.
 Podostemum saldanhanum (Warm.) C.T.Philbrick & Novelo, 2004: Brazil (Rio de Janeiro).
 Podostemum scaturiginum (Mart.) C.T.Philbrick & Novelo, 2004: Central Brazil.
 Podostemum weddellianum (Tul.) C.T.Philbrick & Novelo, 2004: Eats and South Brazil.

References

Podostemaceae
Malpighiales genera